Jean-Marc Lanthier may refer to:

Jean-Marc Lanthier (general), Canadian Army officer
Jean-Marc Lanthier (ice hockey) (born 1963), Canadian ice hockey player

See also